The 2013 Colorado Ice season was the team's seventh season as a football franchise and fifth in the Indoor Football League (IFL). Founded in 2007 as part of United Indoor Football, the Colorado Ice became charter members of the IFL when the UIF merged with the Intense Football League before the 2009 season. One of just nine teams that competed in the IFL for the 2013 season, the Fort Collins-based Colorado Ice were members of the Intense Conference. In their second season under head coach Heron O'Neal, the team played their home games at the Budweiser Events Center in Loveland, Colorado.

Off-field moves
Shortly before the 2013 season began, the owner of the Cheyenne Warriors died which forced that team to suspend operations and the IFL to revise its schedule to accommodate the now 9-team league.

In late May 2013, the team extended the contract of head coach Heron O'Neal through the 2017 season.

Schedule
Key:

Preseason

Regular season

Roster

Standings

References

External links
 Colorado Ice at Loveland Reporter-Herald
 Colorado Ice official statistics
 2013 IFL regular season schedule

Colorado Ice
Colorado Crush (IFL)
Colorado Ice